Aaron Derek O'Connor (born 9 August 1983) is an English footballer who currently plays for Carlton Town, where he plays as a forward.

Playing career

Scunthorpe United
Born in Nottingham, Nottinghamshire, O'Connor started his career at Ilkeston Town before moving to Third Division side Scunthorpe United on 12 December 2002. However, O'Connor featured in just three games as a substitute. Manager Brian Laws released the 19-year-old in February 2003, claiming he did not have the right attitude for the professional club.

Nuneaton Borough and Ilkeston Town
O'Connor had a brief spell at Nuneaton Borough at the start of the 2003–04 season, before moving back to Ilkeston Town.

Gresley Rovers
He then moved onto Gresley Rovers in July 2004. He spent two and a half seasons at Gresley, winning the Player's Player of The Year, Manager's Player of The Year and Supporter's Player of The Year awards in both seasons. O'Connor had a very impressive record of scoring 80 goals in 127 appearances for the club in all competitions.
He had a two-week trial with Rushden & Diamonds in June 2006.

Grays Athletic
Grays Athletic announced the signing of O'Connor on 5 January 2007, and he made his debut the following day against Southport in the Conference National. Despite being offered a new contract for the 2008–09 season, he did not sign and subsequently was released.

Mansfield Town
He was signed by Mansfield Town on 8 August 2008, where he made 39 appearances in the Conference Premier, scoring eight goals. He was released at the end of the 2008–09 season.

Rushden & Diamonds
On 17 June 2009, O'Connor signed for Rushden & Diamonds on a one-year contract. He signed a one-year contract extension in May 2010. Over the course of two seasons, in which he was appointed Rushden's club captain, O'Connor scored 27 goals in 78 games.

Luton Town

O'Connor left Rushden & Diamonds and joined Luton Town on a free transfer on 6 June 2011.

Newport County
In July 2012, O'Connor was reunited with former Rushden & Diamonds manager Justin Edinburgh when he signed for Newport County. In August 2012 O'Connor was selected as Conference Player of the Month after Newport County won all five of their opening matches of the 2012–13 season with O'Connor scoring six goals. He was part of the Newport team that finished third in the league, reaching the Conference Premier play-offs. Newport won the 2013 Conference Premier play-off Final versus Wrexham at Wembley Stadium 2–0 to return to the Football League after a 25-year absence with promotion to League Two. O'Connor scored the second goal. He was released by Newport in May 2015 at the end of his contract.

Forest Green Rovers
On 12 June 2015, he joined National League club Forest Green Rovers on a one-year deal. He made his debut for the club on the opening day of the 2015-16 season in a 1–0 away win against Altrincham. His first goal followed in his second appearance, as his first half strike against Welling United at The New Lawn proved to be enough to secure a 1–0 victory.

Stevenage
He joined League Two side Stevenage on a one-month loan on 15 January 2016. He made his Stevenage debut the following day on 16 January 2016, playing 81 minutes in a 3–2 away loss against Plymouth Argyle. On 1 February 2016, he secured a permanent move to Stevenage after he had his contract cancelled by Forest Green by mutual consent. He was released by Stevenage in May 2016.

Kettering Town
O'Connor joined Kettering Town on 3 September 2016, and was voted the Fans' and Overall Player of the Year for the season 2017–18.

Tamworth
It was confirmed on 15 July 2020, that O'Connor had signed for Southern League Premier Division Central side Tamworth.  He made his debut for Tamworth on 29 September 2020 in a 2–1 home victory over Barwell, coming on as a 78th minute substitute for Gerry McDonagh.

Basford United
O'Connor signed for Northern Premier League Premier Division side Basford United on 6 August 2021.

Career statistics

Club

Honours

Club

Kettering Town
Northamptonshire Cup: 2017–18;
Northamptonshire Senior Cup: 2017–18
Southern League Premier Division Central: 2018–19

References

External links

1983 births
Living people
Footballers from Nottingham
English footballers
Association football forwards
Ilkeston Town F.C. (1945) players
Scunthorpe United F.C. players
Nuneaton Borough F.C. players
Gresley F.C. players
Grays Athletic F.C. players
Mansfield Town F.C. players
Rushden & Diamonds F.C. players
Luton Town F.C. players
Newport County A.F.C. players
Forest Green Rovers F.C. players
Stevenage F.C. players
Kettering Town F.C. players
Tamworth F.C. players
Basford United F.C. players
Carlton Town F.C. players
English Football League players
National League (English football) players
Northern Premier League players
Southern Football League players